The 2017–18 Dartmouth Big Green women's basketball team represents Dartmouth College during the 2017–18 NCAA Division I women's basketball season. The Big Green, led by fifth year head coach Belle Koclanes, play their home games at Leede Arena and were members of the Ivy League. They finished the season 15–12, 7–7 in Ivy League play to finish in fifth place and failed to qualify for the Ivy League women's tournament.

Roster

Schedule

|-
!colspan=9 style=| Non-conference regular season

|-
!colspan=9 style=| Ivy League regular season

See also
 2017–18 Dartmouth Big Green men's basketball team

References

Dartmouth Big Green women's basketball seasons
Dartmouth
Dartmouth Big Green women's
Dartmouth